Traditional Islam In The Modern World is a 1990 book by the Iranian philosopher Seyyed Hossein Nasr.

References

Sources
 
 
 
 
 

Seyyed Hossein Nasr
Books about Islam